Ewan McGregor made his acting debut in 1993 in the British television series Lipstick on Your Collar. He followed this one year later by appearing in Bill Forsyth's Being Human and Danny Boyle's thriller Shallow Grave. Two years later, he played heroin addict Mark Renton in Danny Boyle's Trainspotting which won him international recognition. He reprised the role in the sequel film T2 Trainspotting (2017).

In 1999, he played the Jedi Obi-Wan Kenobi in the first of the Star Wars prequel trilogy Star Wars: Episode I – The Phantom Menace; the character was originally played  by Alec Guinness in the first Star Wars trilogy. He played the role again in its sequels Star Wars: Episode II – Attack of the Clones (2002), and Star Wars: Episode III – Revenge of the Sith (2005). In the 2015 film Star Wars: The Force Awakens and the 2019 film Star Wars: The Rise of Skywalker, McGregor reprised the role of Obi-Wan in voice cameos. In 2022, he reprised his role in the miniseries of the same name on Disney+. His uncle, Denis Lawson, had played Wedge Antilles in the original trilogy. 

For his role as Christian in the 2001 jukebox musical romantic drama film, Moulin Rouge! he received his first nomination for a Golden Globe, for Best Actor – Motion Picture Musical or Comedy. Eleven years later, he was nominated for Salmon Fishing in the Yemen (2012), in the same category. In 2010, McGregor's performance as the Ghost Writer in Roman Polanski's psychological thriller The Ghost Writer won the European Film Award for Best Actor. In 2016, McGregor made his directorial feature film debut in American Pastoral.

Film

Television

Theatre

Video games

See also
 List of awards and nominations received by Ewan McGregor

References

External links
 

Male actor filmographies
Scottish filmographies
British filmographies